Zagrotes is a genus of Iranian ground spiders, first described by Alireza Zamani, Maria Chatzaki, Sergei L. Esyunin and Yuri M. Marusik in 2021.

Species
 it contains four species:
Z. apophysalis Zamani, Chatzaki, Esyunin & Marusik, 2021 (type)
Z. bifurcatus (Zamani, Chatzaki, Esyunin & Marusik, 2021)
Z. borna Zamani & Marusik, 2021 
Z. parla Zamani & Marusik, 2021

See also
 Berinda
 List of Gnaphosidae species

References

Further reading

Gnaphosidae genera
Arthropods of Iran